Khlong Tan is an intersection and its surrounding neighbourhood in Bangkok's Suan Luang sub-district, Suan Luang district.

History
Khlong Tan is a minor tributary of Khlong Saen Saep that connects to Khlong Phra Khanong (currently considered part of Khlong Saen Saep) that flows through this area. The longest canal in Thailand with distance is 72 km (about 44 mi) from the downtown Bangkok to the east in Chachoengsao province. Khlong Saen Saep was dug during the reign of King Nangklao (Rama III) in the early Rattanakosin period. Most of the workmen are Muslims from southern Thailand, including the Malay Peninsula. When the canal was finished he allowed these Muslims to settle down the length of the canal, ranging from the present-day Bobae neighbourhood (the end of Khlong Maha Nak area and Khlong Saen Saep is a continuation) in Pom Prap Sattru Phai district hereafter. 

It is assumed that the name of "Khlong Tan" is distorted from the word "Kalantan" (กลันตัน), referring to Kelantan State in Malaysia. Their hometown.

The canal divided into two phases; Khlong Saen Saep Tai (คลองแสนแสบใต้, "south Saen Saep"), also known as Khlong Bang Kapi, this phase has an end at Khlong Tan; and Khlong Sean Saep Nuea (คลองแสนแสบเหนือ, "north Saen Saep") is a phase that continues from Khlong Tan as far as terminates at Chachoengsao province where it confluence Bang Pakong river.

Characteristics
It is where Phetchaburi (section New Phetchaburi) and Soi Sukhumvit 71 (Pridi Banomyong)—the downtown's eastward and northward roads—ends, and is also the beginning of Phatthanakan and Ramkhamhaeng roads. There is an overpass along the Phetchaburi–Phatthanakan direction. 

Khlong Tan originated as a three-way junction where the end of Phetchaburi met Ramkhamhaeng, and Pridi Banomyong roads. The expansion of Phatthanakan road in 1976 made it four-way intersection like today.

Transportation
The area is served by the Ramkhamhaeng station (A5) of the State Railway of Thailand (SRT), whose Airport Rail Link (ARL) passes through. Khlong Saen Saep boat service ran through the area, docking to pick up passengers at Sapan Klongtun pier (E13) near the intersection.

Accidents
In the year 2019, the overpass has an accident when motorcyclists drive at high speeds. Causing three deaths at the same point in a matter of months.

References 

Neighbourhoods of Bangkok
Suan Luang district
Road junctions in Bangkok